The Cangnan Stele is the temple stele of the Yuan Dynasty Manichean monastery Xuanzhen Temple. It is the only Manichean stone monument found in the world so far, Has been listed as a national second-class cultural relic, now in the Cangnan County Museum, in Zhejiang Province.  The monument is 150 cm high, 76 cm wide, and 10 cm thick, half On the forehead of the round stele, the inscription is inscribed in seal script "Xuansiji". Lin Wushu called the Xuanzhen Temple according to the inscription "It was built by the church of the neighboring countries of Jiangsu, and was built before the Gai Peng family." , Which means that the Mingjiao of Xuanzhen Temple still inherits the tradition of Manicheanism in the Tang Dynasty, advertised by foreign religions, and is different from ordinary folk religions.

Inscription 
The full text of the stele:

See also 
 Cao'an
 Manichaean stone reliefs of Shangwan village
Qianku Manicheans

References 

Manichaean texts
Cangnan County
Religion in China
Chinese Manichaeism